The city of Allentown, Pennsylvania was founded in 1762 as Northampton Town by William Allen, a wealthy shipping merchant. During its first fifty years of existence, Northampton Town was a small unincorporated settlement, consisting of a few homes, stores and taverns.

Political origins
After reaching a population of over 700 residents in the 1810 United States Census, the Commonwealth of Pennsylvania gave Northampton Town a legal existence on March 18, 1811, by incorporating it as the Borough of Northampton, in Northampton County. Previous to this Northampton Town had community leaders, and with its incorporation as a borough, the first local politicians were born. The first borough election was held at the tavern of George Savitz, a tavern-keeper who owned the Square and Compass, an inn located at the northeast corner of 7th and Hamilton Streets.

Peter Rhodes was chosen as the first burgess;  George Rhoads as the town clerk; John F. Rhue as the High Constable, and a town council was established as the first civic legislature.  Peter Rhodes was a prominent citizen and shopkeeper who served on the Committee for Public Safety in Northampton during the Revolutionary War.  The first business of the borough government was to order cows to seek other pastures other than the public streets, an action which led many of its citizens to believe they were better off when it was plain Northampton Town, before it became a borough.

In 1812, Lehigh County was formed by partitioning a section of Northampton County, and Northampton was designated as its county seat.  Frederick Eckert was elected as the second burgess.  George Graff was elected burgess in 1813; however, records of elections in Northampton have been lost from the period 1815–1830.  On April 16, 1836, an act of the Pennsylvania Legislature changed the name of the community from Northampton to Allentown, and John P. Rhue was burgess.  During its existence as a Borough, Northampton/Allentown had a total of forty-seven annual municipal elections.  A burgess was elected each year, the most prominent was John J. Krauss, being elected five times in succession from 1830 to 1835.  Other known burgesses of the town were Samuel Runk (1839–1849); Robert E. Wright (1845), and Peter Wycoff (1846). In 1866, William Kern was elected burgess over Thomas Mohr by a vote of 974 to 881, Kern being the last burgess of Allentown

City of Allentown Mayors
The first step in changing the local government in Allentown began in January 1866, when the various ward districts called for a consolidation of the various schools into one school district as a central authority.  This led to other consolidations of the various wards into centralized police departments, a treasurer and also a consolidated council.  Within a year, legislation was proposed in Harrisburg by Lehigh County State Senator  George P. Shall to incorporate Allentown as a city.  The legislation was passed by the Pennsylvania Legislature on March 12, 1867, creating the City of Allentown, and the first city election was held on May 1.  The first city charter specified a Bicameral form of government, consisting of a Select Council of fourteen (including the mayor) and a Common Council of twenty-eight members.

First City Government Charter (1867)

Commission City Government Charter (1913)

Strong Mayor City Government Charter (1970)

Home Rule City Government Charter (1996)

References